Art competitions were held as part of the 1932 Summer Olympics in Los Angeles, United States.  Medals were awarded in five categories (architecture, literature, music, painting, and sculpture), for works inspired by sport-related themes.

Art competitions were part of the Olympic program from 1912 to 1948, but were discontinued due to concerns about amateurism and professionalism.  Since 1952, a non-competitive art and cultural festival has been associated with each game.

Architecture

Literature

Music

Painting

Sculpture

Medal table
At the time, medals were awarded to these artists, but art competitions are no longer regarded as official Olympic events by the International Olympic Committee (IOC).  These events do not appear in the IOC medal database, and these totals are not included in the IOC's medal table for the 1932 Games.

Events summary

Architecture
Designs for Town Planning

The following architects took part:

Architectural Designs

The following architects took part:

Further entries

The following architects took part:

Literature
The following writers took part:

Music
The following composers took part:

Painting
Drawings and water colours

The following painters took part: